Kottappally  is a village in Kozhikode district in the state of Kerala, India. The village is located 10  kilometres east of Vatakara and 10 kilometres west of Kuttiady. Villiappally (5 km) and Thiruvallur (4 km) and Valliyad (1 km)  are the other nearby villages.

The Mahe-Vatakara Canal is passing through this way and it is said that the work will finish almost about 2015. The place is in Thiruvallur Panchayath.

Demographics
 India census, Kottappally had a population of 19417 with 9308 males and 10109 females.

Transportation 
Kottappally is well connected with all the places in the district as well as the state. Kavil-Theekkuni road is passing through this village.  NH-17 is just 10 Kilometres far from Kottappally. Vatakara railway station is the nearest railway station that is in just 10 Kilometres distance. Nearest Airport is  Calicut International Airport, approx.  80 km away, the nearest Airport for Kottappally is Kannur International Airport.52 km only

Educational institutions 
 Kottappally MLP School
 Kottappally LP School
 Kannambathkara LP School
 Valliyad UP School

References

Villages in Kozhikode district
Kuttiady area